Veaceslav Oriol (born 29 August 1968) is a Moldovan cyclist. He competed in the men's individual road race at the 1996 Summer Olympics.

References

External links
 

1968 births
Living people
Moldovan male cyclists
Olympic cyclists of Moldova
Cyclists at the 1996 Summer Olympics
Place of birth missing (living people)